Bruce Biers (or Byers) Kendall (February 28, 1919 – July 6, 2012) was an American hotelier and Republican and Democratic politician from the territory and state of Alaska.

A Methodist, Kendall was born in Martinsburg, Nebraska and grew up in Sioux City, Iowa. He later moved to Alaska, living in Cordova, Valdez and Anchorage. He became one of the first members of the Alaska House of Representatives in 1959 after statehood.

In 1963, he became the first Republican Speaker of the Alaska House of Representatives. After Democrats regained control of the House, he was replaced as a speaker by Mike Gravel, future U.S. Senator.

Kendall remained a member of the State House until 1966.  He later switched to the Democratic Party, and was the party's nominee for an open seat on the Alaska Senate in 1978, losing to Arliss Sturgulewski.

External links
 The Political Graveyard
 Kendall, Bruce Biers (Google Books)
 Anchorage Daily News Obituary
 Bruce Kendall at 100 Years of Alaska's Legislature

1919 births
2012 deaths
Alaska Democrats
Alaska Republicans
American hoteliers
Methodists from Alaska
Businesspeople from Anchorage, Alaska
Politicians from Anchorage, Alaska
People from Cordova, Alaska
People from Dixon County, Nebraska
Politicians from Sioux City, Iowa
People from Valdez, Alaska
Speakers of the Alaska House of Representatives
Members of the Alaska House of Representatives
20th-century American politicians